George Thomas Bryan Palmer (1899–1990) was an Australian Rugby Union player who coached the Wallabies. He has been described as "one of the most colourful personalities in Australian rugby".

Early life
Palmer was born in Dubbo, New South Wales, the son of T D Palmer, who had played Rugby for the Waratahs in 1899. He played his first Rugby in Dubbo before attending Newington College as a boarder (1915–1916).

War service
Palmer served with the Australian Light Horse in World War I and was invalided home after a bout of near fatal pneumonia. As part of his recovery he joined the Glebe-Balmain Rugby Club to build up his strength and over the ensuing seven seasons played 93 games on the wing.

Representative rugby
His first of seven matches for NSW was played in 1927. Palmer was selected and toured with the Wallabies to New Zealand in 1931 but didn't play a match.

Coach
Between 1963 and 1967 he was the coach of the national side, retiring at the age of 68.

Honours
 Palmer Shield - Played for by NSW Primary Schools
 Bryan Palmer Shield - Played for each year by The King's School and Newington College since the centenary of rugby between the two schools in 1970

References

1899 births
1990 deaths
Australian rugby union players
Australian rugby union coaches
People educated at Newington College